The General Council of the Trades Union Congress is an elected body which is responsible for carrying out the policies agreed at the annual British Trade Union Congresses (TUC).

Organisation
The council has 56 members, all of whom must be proposed by one of the unions affiliated to the TUC.  Unions with more members receive an automatic allocation of seats, in proportion to their membership.  Smaller unions propose candidates for eleven elected seats.  In addition, there are separately elected seats: four for women, three for black workers, at least one of whom must be a woman, and one each for young workers, workers with disabilities, and LGBT workers.  The General Secretary also has a seat on the council.

Some members of the council are further elected to serve on the smaller Executive Committee of the TUC.  The President of the Trades Union Congress is also chosen by the General Council.

Although the TUC has long had links with the Labour Party, members of the General Council are not permitted to sit on Labour's National Executive Committee.

History

1921 to 1983
Until 1921, the leading body of the TUC was the Parliamentary Committee.  This had seventeen members, but by the collapse of the Triple Alliance, it was considered ineffective and to have insufficient powers in industrial matters.

The new General Council had 32 members, elected from industrial groups, each consisting of one or more unions operating in a particular industry.  Two of the places were reserved for women.  It received additional powers to intervene in the case of major industrial disputes, and to resolve inter-union conflicts.  In 1924, the Joint Consultative Committee was set up, which brought trades councils ultimately under the control of the General Council.  However, these powers were not always exercised; many members of the council in the early years were elected on grounds of seniority, rather than recent accomplishments.  Some were associated with left- and right-wing factions, although most were not strongly identified with a particular wing of the movement.

Changes to the groups and numbers of seats were made over time, as the number of workers represented in different industries fluctuated, but the system survived intact until the early 1980s.

Group 1: Mining and Quarrying

Most of the members elected from Group 1 represented the large Miners' Federation of Great Britain, or its successor, the National Union of Mineworkers, but there were several smaller unions which often managed to win one seat.

Group 2: Railways

Throughout this period, Group 2 comprised three railway unions: the Associated Society of Locomotive Engineers and Firemen (ASLEF), National Union of Railwaymen (NUR) and Transport Salaried Staffs' Association (TSSA).  Each usually saw its general secretary elected to one of the three seats, although the abolition of one seat in 1969 left a battle between ASLEF and the TSSA for the second seat.

Group 3: Transport (other than railways)

By far the largest union in Group 3 was the Transport and General Workers' Union (TGWU), although representatives of the National Union of Seamen and a couple of minor unions often secured one seat.

Group 4: Shipbuilding

The Amalgamated Society of Boilermakers dominated Group 4, with various smaller unions gradually merging into it or the general unions.

Group 5: Engineering, Founding and Vehicle Building

Group 5 contained a large number of unions - 26 in 1934 - and while the Amalgamated Engineering Union (AEU) reliably won at least one seat, unions like the Electrical Trades Union (ETU) and United Patternmakers' Association (UPA) often won seats.

Group 6: Technical, Engineering and Scientific

Group 7: Electrical

Group 8: Iron and Steel and Minor Metal Trades
The Iron and Steel and Minor Metal Trades Group was originally Group 6, but was renumbered in 1968.  The Iron and Steel Trades Confederation (ISTC) was the largest union in the group, and consistently held one of its seats.  Until 1966, there was a second seat, held by the tiny National Union of Gold, Silver and Allied Trades (NUGSAT), and later by the National Union of Blastfurnacemen (NUB).  There were many other small unions in the group - in 1934, it had 23 members.

Group 9: Building, Woodworking and Furnishing

The Building, Woodworking and Furnishing Group was originally Group 7, but was renumbered in 1965.  While there were initially a large number of unions in the group, the Amalgamated Union of Building Trade Workers (AUBTW) and Amalgamated Society of Woodworkers (ASW) generally won the seats, and later became part of the Union of Construction, Allied Trades and Technicians (UCATT), which dominated the group from the 1970s.  The National Amalgamated Furnishing Trades Association (NAFTA) won a seat in the early years, and pursued an independent course throughout this period.

Group 9: Cotton

The Cotton Group was the original Group 9; in 1968, it was merged into the Textiles Group.  The cotton industry had a large number of small trade unions, and in 1934, the group had 46 members.  Unusually, the majority of individual members of the unions were women, but the seats were always won by men, representing one of the three amalgamations to which most of the unions belonged: the Amalgamated Weavers' Association (AWA), the Amalgamated Association of Operative Cotton Spinners (AAOCS), and the Cardroom Amalgamation (CWA).

Group 10: Printing and Paper

The Printing and Paper Group was originally Group 8, but was renumbered in 1968.  Almost all of its members were involved with printing, and in the early years, the seat was contested by four larger unions: the London Society of Compositors (LSC), National Society of Operative Printers and Assistants (NATSOPA), National Union of Printing, Bookbinding and Paper Workers (NUPBPW), and Typographical Association (TA).  Over the years, these undertook a series of mergers, forming new unions, including the Society of Graphical and Allied Trades (SOGAT).

Group 11: Textiles

The Textiles Group was originally Group 10: Textiles (other than cotton).  Although there were a wide variety of unions - 18 in 1934 - the National Union of Textile Workers (NUTW), and then its successor, the National Union of Dyers, Bleachers and Textile Workers (NUDBTW), almost always won the seat.  In 1968, the cotton group was merged in, forming Group 11: Textiles, and while the dyers generally won the seat (latterly as a section of the Transport and General Workers' Union (TGWU), the main cotton workers' union, the National Union of Textile and Allied Workers (NUTAW), held it for a few years.

Group 12: Clothing
The Clothing Group was dominated by the National Union of Tailors and Garment Workers (NUTGW), which gradually absorbed the smaller unions of tailors.  It also included unions for hosiery workers which eventually merged as the National Union of Hosiery and Knitwear Workers, and the two Felt Hatters' and Trimmers' Unions of Great Britain.  Originally Group 11, in 1968 it absorbed the Boot, Shoe and Leather Group, and was renumbered as Group 12.

Group 12: Boot, Shoe and Leather

The Boot, Shoe and Leather Group was dominated by the National Union of Boot and Shoe Operatives (NUBSO).  It also included smaller rivals, notably the Rossendale Union of Boot, Shoe and Slipper Operatives, unions of leather workers, and the National Union of Glovers.  The Boot, Shoe and Leather Group was the original Group 12, but in 1968 it was merged into the Clothing Group.

Group 13: Glass, Pottery, Chemicals, Food, Drink, Tobacco, Brushmaking and Distribution

Group 13 was highly diverse.  The most important unions were those involved in distribution, the National Amalgamated Union of Shop Assistants, Warehousemen and Clerks (NAUSAWC) and the National Union of Distributive and Allied Workers  (NUDAW), which later merged to form the Union of Shop, Distributive and Allied Workers.  In 1952, a second seat was added, and this was invariably filled by representatives of smaller unions, the largest of which were the Bakers', Food and Allied Workers' Union (BFAWU) and the National Society of Pottery Workers (NSPW).  There were many smaller unions, and the Tobacco Workers' Union (TWU) secured representation for a few years.

Group 14: Agriculture

For most of the period, the National Union of Agricultural and Allied Workers (NUAAW) was the only union in Group 14.  The Scottish Farm Servants' Union, initially also in this group, merged into the Transport and General Workers' Union early on.

Group 15: Public Employees

Group 15 brought together unions of state and local authority workers.  However, the Trade Union Act 1927 banned state employees from joining the TUC, leaving the group dominated by the National Union of Public Employees (NUPE), Mental Hospital and Institutional Workers' Union (MHIWU), National Union of County Officers and Fire Brigades Union (FBU).  The ban was lifted after World War II, but a new group was added for civil servants.  Despite this, the public employees group steadily grew in size, the affiliation of the National and Local Government Officers' Association and the National Union of Teachers being particularly important, while the Confederation of Health Service Employees (COHSE) absorbed the MHIWU.

Group 16: Civil Servants
The Civil Servants Group was added in 1946, when unions of civil servants were first permitted to affiliate to the TUC.

Group 17: Non-Manual Workers

The Non-Manual Workers Group consisted of clerks, insurance staff, workers in entertainment, and doctors.  Many of its unions grew rapidly during this period, with the Association of Professional, Executive, Clerical and Computer Staff (APEX), National Association of Theatrical and Kine Employees (NATKE) and Association of Cinematograph, Television and Allied Technicians (ACTT) becoming important.  The National Federation of Insurance Workers - later part of the National Union of Insurance Workers - was also sizable, but never gained a seat on the council, unlike the smaller Musicians' Union.

The Non-Manual Workers Group was originally Group 16 and was renumbered on the creation of the Civil Servants Group, in 1946.

Group 18: General Workers
There were initially a large number of unions of general workers, but within a couple of decades, they had all been absorbed into two large general unions - the National Union of General and Municipal Workers (NUGMW), which became the sole union in this group, and the Transport and General Workers' Union, which was instead placed in Group 3.  The General Workers Group was originally Group 17 and was renumbered on the creation of the Civil Servants Group, in 1948.

Group 19: Women Workers

In 1921, the Women's Trade Union League became the Women's Section of the TUC, and most women's trade unions merged into their counterparts.  In exchange, the TUC agreed to create a two-member group, to ensure that women workers had representation on the council.  The group was originally numbered 18, and was renumbered on the creation of the Civil Servants Group.

The group was expanded to five seats in 1981.

1983 to present
After many years of discussion, a comprehensive restructure of the council was agreed in 1982, and took place following the annual TUC meeting in September 1983.  Initially, the new council had 53 members, with those unions with more than 100,000 members gaining automatic seats and therefore becoming eligible to nominate members without them being subject to a vote of other unions.  Six seats were initially reserved for women.

Section A: Larger unions

Current members

Former members

Section B: Unions with 30,000 to 200,000 members
Section B originated as part of Section A, unions with 100,000 to 200,000 members being automatically entitled to one seat on the council.

In 1989, these unions were moved to a new Section B, but there were no changes to their entitlement of seats.

Unions with 30,000 to 99,999 members moved to Section B in 2012.

Section C: Other unions
Unions with fewer than 100,000 members were placed in Section B until 1989.

In 1989, the section for small unions was renamed Section C, and was reduced to eight members.

Increased to 11 members in 2001.

In 2012, unions with 30,000 to 99,999 members were moved to Section B, and Section C was reduced to seven members.

Section D: Women

Reduced to four members in 1989.

Sections E, F and G: Black workers

Section H: Disabled workers
Created 2001

Section I: LGBT workers
Created 2001

Section J: Young workers
Created 2001

References

 
1921 establishments in the United Kingdom
Trades Union Congress